Abdul Nasser Bani Hani also known as Abu Jamal (died 6 October 2013) was a Jordanian politician. Bani Hani was chosen in the Parliamentary elections of 2010 and served in the 16th Parliament of Jordan in the House of Representatives as a representative of the First District of Irbid Governorate. His term ended when new elections were held early 2013.

Death
Bani Hani was killed on 6 October 2013 during a tribal clash in Al Barha District, Irbid. Bani Hani was in the process of breaking up a group of young men and calming people down when he was shot in the stomach. A total of seven persons were shot in the clashes, including a brother of Bani Hani. Jordan's Interior Minister, Hussein Al-Majali, said that the likely suspect was taken into custody.

References

Year of birth missing
2013 deaths
Jordanian Muslims
Jordanian murder victims
Deaths by firearm in Jordan
People murdered in Jordan
Members of the House of Representatives (Jordan)
2010s murders in Jordan
2013 crimes in Jordan
2013 murders in Asia